St. Mark's Senior Secondary School is a secondary school in Janakpuri in West Delhi, India. The school is affiliated to the Central Board of Secondary Education of India, and runs classes from I to XII including a section for children with special needs. Children are offered the streams of Humanities, Science and Commerce.

In 1990 another Senior Secondary School was established in Meera Bagh, which was inaugurated by the then Lt. Governor of Delhi, Air Chief Marshal Arjan Singh. As of 2011 it had 3,500 students.

A school for girls was inaugurated by the Chief Minister of NCT of Delhi, Ms. Sheila Dikshit. The red-coloured building of the school is located in the prime location of C-1. The school follows the CBSE syllabus.

St. Mark's has laboratories, computers, a library and an audio visual facility. There are playgrounds where students indulge in sports like cricket, football, tennis, and basketball. The school encourages the students to participate in NCC, Scouts and camps and excursions.

The school motto is "Loyalty, Truth and Honour".

Located in the prime location of C-1, Janakpuri is the eye-catching red coloured building of St. Mark’s Senior Secondary Public School, Janakpuri, which has become a landmark of the area.

The school building houses a library catering to the needs of both students and teachers. The school also subscribes to major newspapers, magazines and journals.

The four computer centers have 50 computers where in the students of classes I to XII are provided computer education.

The NCC has 50 cadets and annual training camps are organized. Active participation in PM Rally is also an important feature of NCC. The school also has scouts, Cubs & Bulbuls.

A conference room equipped with an LCD Projector is used for meetings and interactive sessions. A medical facility is provided to all students in the Medical Investigating room.

The school playground has facilities for games including basketball, badminton, cricket, table tennis, volleyball, handball, and skating. Coaching facilities are available for cricket, handball and skating.

Catholic secondary schools in India
Christian schools in Delhi
High schools and secondary schools in Delhi
Schools in West Delhi
Educational institutions in India with year of establishment missing